Palagianello (Tarantino:  or  or ) is a small town in the province of Taranto, Apulia, southeastern Italy.

References

External links 
 Official website

Cities and towns in Apulia